Myasnikovka is a rural locality (a passing loop) in Pertsevskoye Rural Settlement, Gryazovetsky District, Vologda Oblast, Russia. The population was 14 as of 2002.

Geography 
Myasnikovka is located 10 km north of Gryazovets (the district's administrative centre) by road. Myasnikovo is the nearest rural locality.

References 

Rural localities in Gryazovetsky District